The ARP Chroma is a polyphonic, multitimbral, microprocessor controlled, subtractive synthesis analog synthesizer developed in 1979-1980 by ARP Instruments, Inc. just before the company's bankruptcy and collapse in 1981.

The design was purchased by 
CBS Musical Instruments and put into production by their Rhodes Division in 1982 as the Rhodes Chroma at a list price of US $5295. They also released a keyboard-less version of the Chroma called the Chroma Expander at a list price of US $3150.

The Chroma was one of the early microprocessor-controlled analog synthesizers. It was designed before MIDI and featured a 25-pin D-sub connector computer interface used to slave the Expander to the Chroma. Also, an Apple IIe interface card and sequencing software was available.

The Rhodes Chroma and Expander were discontinued in 1984. Somewhere between 1400 and 3000 Chromas and Expanders were built.

Keyboard velocity and pressure

The Chroma has a velocity-sensitive keyboard consisting of 64 weighted, levered wooden keys that resemble piano keys.

Every Chroma has software and interface hardware for an optional polyphonic pressure-sensitive keyboard sensor. But few units have the original factory pressure sensor installed. In 2009, a pressure sensor retrofit kit was produced by a third party. At the time of writing (2015) the kit may still be available.

Polyphony
The Chroma has sixteen synthesizer "channels" each consisting of one oscillator, waveshaper, filter and amplifier. Sound programs can use one channel per voice to produce sixteen voice polyphony. However, most sound programs use two channels per voice which delivers a fatter sound, but reduces the polyphony to eight voices.

Architecture
The Chroma's sixteen synthesizer channels consist of one Voltage Controlled Oscillator, Waveshaper, Filter, and Amplifier under software control via multiplexed analog voltage control channels. The channels are grouped into eight pairs. One channel in each pair is labelled "A" and the other "B".

Although the oscillators, filters and amplifiers themselves are voltage controlled, the overall control of the synthesizer channels is entirely in software. The embedded computer generates thirty-two ADSR envelopes (two per channel, one with delay) and sixteen LFO sweep signals in software. Signals from the levers, pedals, control panel or the keyboard are all encoded digitally, processed by the computer, and sent to the synthesizer channels on the voice cards via several multiplexed analog control lines and a number of digital control registers.

Sound programs can use one channel per voice to produce sixteen-voice polyphony. However, more synthesizer power is available when channels are paired together. This yields two oscillators, two waveshapers, two filters, two amplifiers, two glides, two LFO sweeps, and four ADR envelopes, in addition to the performance controls.

Modular configuration
The Chroma uses an Electronically Reconfigurable System which allows the VCOs, VCFs and VCAs to be reconfigured, or "patched" like modular synthesizers, but without the patch cords. Instead, the Chroma digitally stores all of the parameters which determine a sound. Sound programs can also be saved to and loaded from cassette.

On page 4 of the Rhodes Chroma Programming Manual, they boast "The Chroma has better patching capabilities than most modular systems, and it's fully programmable."
In fact, the Chroma is often compared to modular synthesizers like the ARP 2600.

A Chroma sound program can be composed of two oscillators, filters and amplifiers in one of fifteen different configurations. Each configuration connects (or  patches) the oscillators, filters and amplifiers together in different ways to provide for a wide variety of possible sounds. For example, filters can be arranged in series for 4 pole or band-pass response, or in parallel for notch filtering. In addition, some configurations feature oscillator synchronization, filter frequency modulation or ring modulation.

When editing a sound program, the configuration is selected via parameter [1] "Patch". The values range from 0 through 15.

Control panel

The Chroma control panel consists of 71 membrane switches. Most of them are multi-purpose and are used to select sound programs or sound program parameters, when in edit mode. A single slider is used to change parameter values.

Competing synthesizer designs of the time, like the Oberheim OB-8, had dozens of knobs and mechanical switches (as opposed to membrane switches) on their control panels. The Chroma's economical approach to control panel design was copied by many later synthesizers like the Yamaha DX-7.

A unique feature of the Chroma is that, when you operate a membrane switch, a "tapper" bumps the underside of the control panel, so as to mimic the tactile feedback of operating a conventional mechanical switch. This is an early example of haptic feedback technology.

Power supply

Perhaps the worst feature of the ARP/Rhodes Chroma is the factory original power supply. It runs very hot, it is unreliable and it is very heavy.

In 2008, a third party designed and produced a digital switching power supply replacement kit for the Chroma and Expander. At the time of writing (2015) the kit may still be available.

CPU
The main microprocessor in the Chroma and Expander is a 68B09, and it has a computer interface consisting of a 25-pin D-sub connector. The factory original Chroma CPU board has 2 AA batteries to preserve memory while the power is off. Many Chroma CPU boards have been damaged from battery leakage.

In 2006, a third party designed and produced a Chroma CPU board replacement kit known as the CC+. The CC+ is available with optional native MIDI support.

External control and MIDI

The Chroma was designed and released before the introduction of MIDI. The Chroma's main microprocessor was a 68B09 with a computer interface consisting of a 25-pin D-sub connector. An Apple IIe interface card (used to connect to the Chroma's D-sub connector) and sequencing software was released by ARP and Fender Rhodes.
 
Multiple third parties came out with Chroma-to-MIDI converter boxes. They use the 25-pin D-sub connector to interface with the Chroma.

In 2006, a third party designed and produced a Chroma CPU board replacement kit known as the CC+. The CC+ is available with optional native MIDI support. At the time of writing (2015), the kit may still be available.

Accessories

The Chroma came with the usual complement of accessories plus some unique extras. In addition to a single footswitch (dedicated to program changes) and a programmable variable (volume type) foot pedal, the Chroma came with a unique Dual Footswitch Assembly. The dual footswitch is a rugged, heavy, solid piece of hardware that mimics a pair of standard piano foot pedals with programmable functions including sostenuto.

The Chroma also came with a custom designed, heavily padded, ATA Anvil (R) case with a pedal compartment. The rumor was that early units shipped without a case were damaged in shipping because the Chroma is so heavy and fragile (a fair criticism). In any case, the Chroma and Expander included a road case.

Chroma expander

Fender also released a keyboard-less version of the Chroma called the Chroma Expander. Like the Chroma, the main microprocessor in the Expander is a 68B09 with a computer interface consisting of a 25-pin D-sub connector. The Expander can be slaved to the Chroma via the 25-pin D-sub connector. Third party Chroma-to-MIDI converter boxes produced for the Chroma also work for the Expander.

References

External links
 rhodeschroma.com - a site and community dedicated to the Rhodes Chroma
 ARP Chroma announcement
 http://www.vintagesynth.com/misc/chroma.php
 Rhodes Chroma Demo, Part 1
 Sound on Sound - Rhodes Chroma Analogue Polysynth (Retro) - October 1995 - NORMAN FAY takes a retro look at the Rhodes Chroma, the last and most obscure of ARP's long line of analogue synthesizers.
 https://www.facebook.com/RhodesChroma
 Synthmuseum.com - Rhodes Chroma
 The ENABLER is a custom made 95-knob dedicated MIDI controller for the CC+ equipped Rhodes Chroma.
 Synthtopia Rhodes Chroma
 Rhodes Chroma (@rhodeschroma) - Twitter
 Rhodes chroma value - Gearslutz.com
 Rhodes Chroma Analog Synthesizer - Synthesizer Database
 ARP Synthesizers fenderrhodes.com
 MATRIXSYNTH: Rhodes Chroma Overview by Eric Frampton
 Vintage Keyboard Studio: Rhodes Chroma/Expander
 BCR2000 Programmer Overlay for Rhodes Chroma
 Rhodes Chroma Editor for iPad by Matrix
 Rhodes-ARP Chroma - Specifications, pictures, prices, links, reviews and ratings - Sonic State
 http://www.native-instruments.com/forum/threads/rhodes-chroma-ni-kontakt-sample-library.180159/
 Rhodes Chroma Ni Kontakt sample library | NI Support Forum

ARP synthesizers
Analog synthesizers
Polyphonic synthesizers